La Reine des Papillons (French for The Queen of the Butterflies) is a 1927 French stop-motion animated short film created by Ladislas Starevich. The film combines live-action sequences starring his daughter Jeanne (aka Nina Star) with puppet animation. Full of special effects, as with Starevich's previous films he used deceased insects as the protagonists of the film.

Synopsis 
A little girl working as a carnival dancer is given a gift of a caterpillar as a joke. She spares the caterpillar's life, and becomes the Queen of the Butterflies.

Cast 
Nina Star as the Queen of the Butterflies

DVD release 
The film was released on DVD in 2013 by Doriane Films alongside four of Starevich's other films that also star Nina.

References

External links 

1927 films
1927 animated films
French animated short films
French black-and-white films
French silent short films
1920s French films